The Vertical Hummingbird is an American helicopter, produced by Vertical Aviation Technologies of Sanford, Florida that was introduced in 1991. The aircraft is supplied as a kit for amateur construction.

Design and development
The Hummingbird is a development of the certified Sikorsky S-52 that first flew in 1947, adapted to kit form. The aircraft features a single main rotor, a four-seat enclosed cabin, quadracycle landing gear and an option for skids. The prototype was converted by Vertical Aviation Technologies from a Sikorsky S-52-3.

The Hummingbird fuselage is made from riveted aluminum sheet. The nose section is adapted from the Bell 206. Its  diameter fully articulated three-bladed main rotor employs a NACA 0015 airfoil.

Variants
VAT S-52-3Prototype of the Hummingbird family, converted from an original Sikorsky S-52-3.
Hummingbird 260L
Version powered by a six cylinder, air-cooled, four-stroke, dual-ignition  Lycoming IVO-435 engine
Hummingbird 300LS
Version powered by an eight cylinder, liquid-cooled, four-stroke, single-ignition  General Motors LS7 V-8 automotive conversion engine, derated to 
Hummingbird 300L
Version powered by a six cylinder, air-cooled, fuel injected IO-540 derated to

Specifications (Hummingbird 300L)

References

External links

1990s United States sport aircraft
1990s United States helicopters
Homebuilt aircraft
Hummingbird
Single-engined piston helicopters
Aircraft first flown in 1991